Little Ogeechee River may refer to:

 Little Ogeechee River (Chatham County)
 Little Ogeechee River (Hancock County)

See also 
 Ogeechee River